Rhododendron prunifolium, the plumleaf azalea, is a wild azalea that grows only in a few counties along the Georgia–Alabama border in the Chattahoochee River Valley. It is considered the rarest azalea in the Eastern United States. Providence Canyon is one of the most popular places to view the plumleaf azalea in the wild.

References

External links
The Nature Conservancy

prunifolium
Plants described in 1913
Flora of North America